Burning Gold is a 1936 American drama film directed by Sam Newfield and starring William Boyd, Judith Allen and Lloyd Ingraham. It is a modern-day western about a World War I veteran who becomes a wildcat prospector for oil and enjoys a major strike.

The film's sets were designed by art director Lewis J. Rachmil. It was made as a B movie by the Poverty Row company Winchester Productions and was distributed by Republic Pictures in the US and British Lion in the United Kingdom.

Famed in his Western role of Hopalong Cassidy, Bill Boyd appeared in three 1936 films of non Western genre for Winchester Productions, all produced by George A. Hirliman, directed by Sam Newfield, and released by Republic Pictures. The other films were Federal Agent and Go-Get-'Em, Haines.

Cast
 William Boyd as Jim Thornton  
 Judith Allen as Caroline 'Carrie' Long  
 Lloyd Ingraham as Calico  
 Frank Mayo as Brent Taylor  
 Fern Emmett as Cousin Lena  
 Dick Curtis as Swede 
 Dennis O'Keefe as Derrick Worker 
 Charles King as Henchman

References

Bibliography
 Pitts, Michael R. Western Movies: A Guide to 5,105 Feature Films. McFarland, 2012.

External links
 

1936 films
1936 drama films
1930s English-language films
American drama films
Films directed by Sam Newfield
Republic Pictures films
Works about petroleum
American black-and-white films
1930s American films